Silarestan-e Sofla Dam Ludab (also Romanized as Sīlārestān-e Soflá Dam Lūdāb; also known as Sīlārestān and Sīlārestān-e Soflá) is a village in Ludab Rural District, Ludab District, Boyer-Ahmad County, Kohgiluyeh and Boyer-Ahmad Province, Iran. At the 2006 census, its population was 40, in 10 families.

References 

Populated places in Boyer-Ahmad County